Alan Horwitz (born January 16, 1944) is an American businessman and the founder and chairman of Campus Apartments, a student housing company headquartered in Philadelphia, Pennsylvania. Horwitz is also a superfan of the Philadelphia 76ers and is known for sitting courtside at every 76ers home game wearing his  #76 SIXTH MAN Jersey.

Bloomberg News has described Horwitz as "one of Philadelphia's top real estate success stories."

Early life
Horwitz was born to a Jewish family and grew up "very poor." However, he was able to move to a wealthy neighborhood at the age of 5 after his father bought and built up an old property. Horwitz attended Overbrook High School.

Business career
Horwitz founded Campus Apartments in 1958 after seeing a lack of affordable housing on the University of Pennsylvania's campus. Horwitz purchased properties around Penn's campus and built quality and affordable housing for students and later university faculty and young people in the workforce. Horwitz was able to capture the student housing market as he took advantage of the lack of competition in the business and because of the undeveloped area surrounding the campus.

Horwitz was a mentor to the current CEO of Campus Apartments, David J. Adelman. Adelman invested $2,000 in his Bar Mitzvah money with Horwitz and Campus Apartments. Horwitz invested those $2,000 in off-campus student housing near Penn.

76ers Fandom
Horwitz is one of the most recognized NBA superfans and has been nicknamed the "Sixth Man" of the Philadelphia 76ers and the "Sixers Jack Nicholson". Horwitz has attended 76ers games since the 1960s when the team played at the Philadelphia Convention Hall and Civic Center and has been a season ticket holder for over 60 years. Horwitz notably kneels courtside during the games and has trademark handshakes with many current and former 76ers including Joel Embiid, Ben Simmons, Jimmy Butler, Justin Anderson, Lou Williams and Elton Brand. Horwitz also has a close relationship with T. J. McConnell who always knocked Horwitz's hat off his head even when he was going  into the game. Horwitz also socializes with many of the players and will take them out to dinner and to Philadelphia Phillies and Philadelphia Eagles games.

Horwitz is still friends with many former 76ers players including Andre Iguodala and Evan Turner. Horwitz is also close with Joel Embiid's family including Embiid's father and sister. Horwitz was invited by Embiid to attend the 2018 NBA All-Star Game in Los Angeles, California with Embiid's father and sister. Horwitz sometimes travels on the team's airplane to away games.

Horwitz has been in multiple altercations throughout his time sitting courtside. In 2012, the 76ers played the Lakers at the Wells Fargo Center. After a loose ball went out of bounds, Horwitz stared down Kobe Bryant and yelled "Get down the other end of the court, fellah. The ball's going this way, not that way." During the 2012 NBA playoffs, Horwitz was ejected from TD Garden during Game 1 of the Eastern Conference Semifinals between the 76ers and the Boston Celtics after making contact with Rajon Rondo. Horwitz sat in the press box with then Sixers' CEO, Adam Aron for the remainder of the game.

In the 2019 NBA Playoffs, Horwitz went viral during the Eastern Conference Semifinals between the 76ers and the Toronto Raptors during the 2019 NBA playoffs. Horwitz attended both Game 1 and 2 of the series in Toronto, Canada and would stand up and shake a 76ers banner after every point scored by the team. In Game 2, Horwitz got into a shouting match with Canadian rapper and Raptors fan, Drake. During Game 4 of the same series, Horwitz taunted and then got into a shouting match with Kyle Lowry after a foul was called. Lowry then asked official Josh Tiven to constrain Horwitz. Horwitz was described as "vociferous" by Mark Jones who was announcing the game.

On May 1, 2019, Horwitz launched an Instagram account. He currently has more than 65,000 followers, including many current and former 76ers players.

Before a home game against the Memphis Grizzlies, on February 7, 2020, Horwitz appeared on court and rang the bell - a 76ers' tradition of ringing a ceremonial bell before the game. Other notable people to have rung the bell include Nick Foles, Bryce Harper, Meek Mill, M. Night Shyamalan, Kevin Hart and Charlie Manuel.

On June 8, 2021, a video between Horwitz and rapper Lil Baby trash talking each other went viral. The video was filmed by rapper Meek Mill during Game 2 of the Eastern Conference Semifinals game between the Philadelphia 76ers and the Atlanta Hawks, with Horwitz and Lil Baby each representing their teams. The video was viewed more than 40 million times and was shared by ESPN, Bleacher Report and other news outlets.

On March 7, 2022, Horwitz was involved in an incident where he was apparently snubbed by 76ers shooting guard James Harden during a game against the Chicago Bulls. Harden, who was stretching near the scorers' table during halftime, was approached by Horwitz, who tried talking to him. However, Harden appeared to ignore Horwitz and walk towards the team huddle. The incident lead to some in the media questioning whether Horwitz had gone too far in his role as the "Sixth Man". It was later revealed that Horwitz attempted to speak to Harden about getting courtside tickets for his mother to an upcoming game. Following the incident, Philadelphia sports blog, Crossing Broad reported that Horwitz had been asked by the team to "tone down" his rhetoric and was previously suspended for a game in February 2022 due to such concerns.

Horwitz has been promised by Sixers' owner, Josh Harris a championship ring and an opportunity to participate in the postgame celebration in the locker room when the 76ers win the NBA Finals.

Personal life
In 2018, Horwitz donated $2 million to help build the Horwitz-Wasserman Holocaust Memorial Plaza on the Benjamin Franklin Parkway in Philadelphia to commemorate the victims of the Holocaust. The plaza is named after Horwitz and Sam Wasserman, a Holocaust survivor from Poland who later moved to America. The plaza is stone-paved and is surrounded by the rail tracks that were outside of Treblinka concentration camp. The plaza also has a grove of trees to represent the woods where the Bielski partisans hid and a digital eternal flame.

On January 21, 2020, it was announced that Horwitz was elected to the Philadelphia Jewish Sports Hall of Fame. A ceremony was held on April 28, 2021, at Rodeph Shalom where Horwitz was inducted and given the first inaugural Philadelphia Sports Spirit Award.

On October 15, 2020, Angelos Pizzeria of South Philly added "The Sixth Man" pizza to their menu to honor Horwitz.  To celebrate this moment, Horwitz pledged a $1.76 donation for every pizza sold to Philadelphia Youth Basketball, a local charity.

Horwitz has been good friends with former Cincinnati Reds Hall of Fame catcher, Johnny Bench since 1967. Horwitz purchased more than $1 million of Bench's memorabilia and returned it to him in 2020.

In 2021, it was announced that Horwitz would donate $5 million to Philadelphia Youth Basketball to help construct a new $25 Million, 100,000 square-foot facility in Philadelphia for the region's youth. The facility will be known as the Alan Horwitz 'Sixth Man' Center and will house 7 basketball courts, education facilities including classrooms as well as activities to improve the civic life of the city. The center is expected to open in late 2022.

Horwitz is also involved in other local Philadelphia charities including the Sixers Youth Foundation, Simon's Heart, Learn Fresh, and Philadelphia Youth Basketball.

References

1944 births
Living people
Businesspeople from Philadelphia
Jewish American sportspeople
American business executives
20th-century American businesspeople
21st-century American businesspeople
Jewish American philanthropists
Philanthropists from Pennsylvania
Businesspeople from Pennsylvania
American real estate businesspeople
Real estate and property developers
Philadelphia 76ers